The gram per cubic centimetre is a unit of density in the CGS system, commonly used in chemistry, defined as mass in grams divided by volume in cubic centimetres. The official SI symbols are g/cm3, g·cm−3, or g cm−3. It is equivalent to the units gram per millilitre (g/mL) and kilogram per litre (kg/L). The density of water is about 1 g/cm3, since the gram was originally defined as the mass of one cubic centimetre of water at its maximum density at 4 °C.

Conversions
1 g/cm3 is equivalent to:
 = 1000 g/L (exactly)
 = 1000 kg/m3 (exactly)
 ≈  (approximately)
 ≈  (approximately)

1 kg/m3 = 0.001 g/cm3(exactly)

1 lb/cu ft ≈  (approximately)

1 oz/US gal ≈  (approximately)

See also
 Kilogram per cubic metre 

Units of chemical measurement
Units of density
Centimetre–gram–second system of units